Dragoslav 'Drago' Čakić (born 15 February 1965 in Split, Croatia, Socialist Federal Republic of Yugoslavia) is a Croatian retired footballer who played as a midfielder.

Club career
In his country, Čakić represented hometown clubs RNK Split and HNK Hajduk Split. In the 1987 summer he moved to Spain, where he remained until his retirement 12 years later, starting with Real Burgos CF in Segunda División.

Čakić also played professionally in the country with Xerez CD (two spells, being relegated from the second level in 1991 and 1998) and CD Ourense. He competed at amateur level with Jerez Industrial CF, CD San Fernando and CD Tortosa, retiring in June 1999 at the age of 34.

References

External links
 

1965 births
Living people
Footballers from Split, Croatia
Association football midfielders
Yugoslav footballers
Croatian footballers
RNK Split players
HNK Hajduk Split players
Real Burgos CF footballers
Xerez CD footballers
Jerez Industrial CF players
CD San Fernando players
CD Ourense footballers
Yugoslav First League players
Segunda División players
Tercera División players
Yugoslav expatriate footballers
Croatian expatriate footballers
Expatriate footballers in Spain
Yugoslav expatriate sportspeople in Spain
Croatian expatriate sportspeople in Spain